The Missouri State Ice Bears are a college ice hockey team, representing Missouri State University and based in Springfield, Missouri. The team competes in the Western Collegiate Hockey League, part of the American Collegiate Hockey Association (ACHA) Division I.

History 
After back to back trips to the ACHA DII National Championships, the Bears were accepted into ACHA Division I hockey as well as the Western Collegiate Hockey League. The Western Collegiate Hockey League includes, Arizona, Arizona State, Colorado, Colorado State, Arkansas, Oklahoma, and Central Oklahoma. A team from the WCHL has won the ACHA National Championship during the 2013 - 2014 season, 2014–2015 season, and the 2016 - 2017 season.

References

External links
 

Ice
College men's ice hockey teams in the United States
Amateur ice hockey teams in Missouri
Sports in Springfield, Missouri
2001 establishments in Missouri
Ice hockey clubs established in 2001